Statistics of Úrvalsdeild in the 1969 season.

Overview
It was contested by 7 teams, and Keflavík won the championship. ÍA's Matthías Hallgrímsson was the top scorer with 9 goals.

League standings

Results
Each team played every opponent once home and away for a total of 12 matches.

References

Úrvalsdeild karla (football) seasons
Iceland
Iceland
Urvalsdeild